Thomas, Tom, or Tommy West may refer to:

Nobility
Thomas West, 1st Baron West (1365–1405)
Thomas West, 2nd Baron West (1391/2–1416)
Thomas West, 8th Baron De La Warr (c. 1457–1525), courtier and military commander
Thomas West, 9th Baron De La Warr (c. 1475–1554)
Thomas West, 2nd Baron De La Warr (c. 1556–1602), MP for Aylesbury, member of Elizabeth I's Privy Council
Thomas West, 3rd Baron De La Warr (1577–1618), Englishman after whom Delaware was named

Politics and law
Thomas West (MP for Lymington) (died 1618), Member of Parliament (MP) for Lymington
Thomas West (MP died 1622), English politician; MP for Chichester, Mitchell and Hampshire
Thomas West (Australian politician) (1830–1896), New South Wales politician
Thomas F. West (1874–1931), American lawyer; Chief Justice of the Florida Supreme Court 
Thomas G. West (born 1945), American professor of politics
Thomas West (American politician) (born 1964), American politician in the Ohio House of Representatives
Tom West (Kansas politician) (1925–1975), American politician in the Kansas state legislature
T. C. West (1868–1936), American lawyer and member of the California State Senate

Sports
Tommy West (baseball), American baseball manager (active 1937–46) in 1942 St. Louis Cardinals season
Tommy West (American football) (born 1954), American football coach
Tom West (rugby union) (born 1996), English rugby union player

Others
Thomas West (priest) (1720–1779), Scottish priest, author, and antiquarian
Thomas James West (1855–1916), English-born theatre entrepreneur
Thomas Summers West (1927–2010), British chemist
Tom West (1939–2011), American technologist and protagonist of the Pulitzer–winning non-fiction book The Soul of a New Machine
Tommy West (producer) (1942–2021), American music executive
W. Thomas West (born 1943), U.S. Air Force general